St. Stephen's & St. Agnes School (SSSAS) is an independent Episcopal coed private college preparatory school in Alexandria, Virginia.  The school was created from the 1991 merger of St. Agnes School (a girls' school founded in 1924) with St. Stephen's School (a boys' school founded in 1944).  The school consists of three campuses within a 1.5-mile radius. The Lower School, grades JK-5, is located on Fontaine Street; the Middle School, grades 6-8, is located on Braddock Road; and the Upper School, grades 9-12, is located on St. Stephen's Road. St. Stephens & St. Agnes honor code is "I will not lie, cheat, or steal nor tolerate those who do".

St. Stephen's & St. Agnes School serves students from across Northern Virginia, Maryland, and Washington, D.C. The old St. Stephen's was one of the founding schools of the Interstate Athletic Conference.

Statistics

Advanced courses offered
The school offers Advanced Placement courses in Art History, Biology, Calculus AB, Calculus BC, Chemistry, Comparative Government, Computer Science, Economics (Micro and Macro), English, European History, French Language, Latin, Music Theory, Physics, Psychology, Spanish Language, Spanish Literature, Statistics, Studio 2-D Art, Studio 3-D Art, US Government and Politics, US History and World History.

Statistics
There are 1120 students enrolled at SSSAS, twenty-eight percent are students of color. Twenty-two percent of students receive grants in aid. Sixty-five percent of the faculty hold advanced degrees.

Administration 
The school is governed by a Head of School, Kirsten Prettyman Adams, an Assistant Head of School, Bob Weiman, and a Board of Governors.

The Board of Governors consists of 27 members. Twenty-three members are elected, two serve ex officio and do not have voting rights, and two are non-voting members of the Association of Parents and Teachers and the Alumni Association. The Board is primarily responsible for the school's finances and determines the school's long-term policies.

Honor code 
St. Stephen's & St. Agnes School is known for its student-established honor system, which is modeled after the honor system at the University of Virginia. Its foundation, the Honor Code, states, As a member of the St. Stephen's & St. Agnes School community, I pledge that I will not lie, cheat, steal, nor tolerate those who do. The student-run Honor Council is responsible for the administration of the Honor Code in the Upper School. Every year in the fall, at the beginning of the school year, students pledge their commitment to the Honor System by signing copies of the Honor Code.

Athletics 
St. Stephen's & St. Agnes School competes in the Interstate Athletic Conference (boys) and Independent School League (girls). The girls' lacrosse team is a perennial power, currently ranked in the top ten in the nation, having finished the 2008 season undefeated.  In 1997 the girls' lacrosse team was ranked #1 in the nation. The 2010 girls' varsity lacrosse won the ISL league title and the VISAA State Championships. Then in 2009, the girls' lacrosse team won their third consecutive VISAA title as number one.

The sports offered include: baseball, basketball, cross country, field hockey, football, golf, ice hockey, lacrosse, soccer, softball, swimming, tennis, track and field, volleyball, and wrestling.

Arts 
The school theatre program, known as the Stage One Players, has won several regional awards for their performances including the Cappies. The 2009 fall production of A Midsummer Night's Dream was nominated for four Cappie Awards (Critics and Artist Program) including lighting, make-up, and supporting actor, putting each in the top five out of 54 productions. In 2015 SSSAS was nominated for five Cappies for the "Richard III" production. Two seniors won a Cappies award in the Creativity category for music composition and performance. In addition, SSSAS received two Cappies nominations for the fall production of “The 39 Steps” in the Sound and Special Effects/Technology categories.

In 2003, the school completed construction of a Chapel and Performing Arts Center (CPAC).

Sustainability

Students For Sustainability
St. Stephen's and St. Agnes School has a drive for sustainability. The school will host its ninth annual “Students For Sustainability” conference in spring 2017.  The third sustainability conference  earned local recognition, where a few attendees were interviewed on by Fox 5 reporters.  Students For Sustainability is a conference in which approximately 100 students from the Washington D.C. metro area come together to learn about the issues and discuss plans for achieving better sustainability in schools.

Recognition
The 2016 Ellen Pickering Environmental Excellence Award has been presented to St. Stephen's & St. Agnes School in Alexandria. The award was presented during the Alexandria Earth Day celebration on April 30, an event sponsored by the City of Alexandria Environmental Policy Commission and Alexandria Renew Enterprises.

St. Stephen's & St. Agnes Middle School was selected as a 2016 U.S. Department of Education Green Ribbon School. This is a national environmental sustainability award presented to schools, districts, and post-secondary institutions. Secretary of Education John King announced the honorees on Earth Day, April 22, 2016. Only six private schools were selected this year and SSSAS is the only one from Virginia, the District of Columbia or Maryland.  SSSAS was formally presented with the award on July 20, 2016, in Washington, DC.

Notable alumni

John McCain, senator and Republican presidential candidate in 2000 and 2008, attended St. Stephen's from 1946 to 1949 before ultimately graduating from Episcopal High School in 1954.
Anne Mollegen Smith (St. Agnes), magazine editor and writer, née Anne Rush Mollegen
Fred Barnes (St. Stephen's Class of 1960), political commentator and Fox News personality
Thomas Boswell  (St. Stephen's Class of 1965), Washington Post senior sports columnist
Leo Braudy (Class of 2011), art dealer
Tipper Gore (St. Agnes Class of 1966), née Mary Elizabeth Aitcheson
Margaret Stender (St. Agnes Class of 1974), founding President and CEO of the WNBA's Chicago Sky
Gerald Fauth (St. Stephen's class of 1974), American consultant and government official
Christopher Meloni (St. Stephen's Class of 1979), actor who portrayed Chris Keller on the HBO prison drama Oz and Elliot Stabler on the NBC police drama Law & Order: SVU
Amy Argetsinger (St. Agnes class of 1986), journalist, staff writer for the Style section of The Washington Post
 Jennifer Griffin (St. Agnes class of 1987), national security correspondent for Fox News
 Dave Flemming (St. Stephen's class of 1994), radio broadcaster for the San Francisco Giants
 Will Flemming, radio broadcaster for the Boston Red Sox
 Terrence Wilkins, former Indianapolis Colts wide receiver
 G. Zachary Terwilliger (Class of 1999), United States Attorney for the Eastern District of Virginia
 Steven Pruitt (Class of 2002), Wikipedia editor who has made more edits on the English Wikipedia than any other editor
Michael Schwimer (Class of 2004), baseball player for the Philadelphia Phillies
Treat Huey (Class of 2004), professional tennis player.
Darius Manora (Class of 2013), captain 2016 Yale football team

References

Independent School League
Educational institutions established in 1924
Schools in Alexandria, Virginia
Private K-12 schools in Virginia
Episcopal schools in the United States
1924 establishments in Virginia
Preparatory schools in Virginia